</ref>

Carol Morgan School is a private international, college-preparatory school located in Santo Domingo, Dominican Republic. The school is formatted based on the American education system and is accredited by Middle States Association of Colleges and Schools.

History
In 1933, while she and her husband were in Santo Domingo on a missionary trip, Carol Morgan was faced with the dilemma of finding an English-language education based on American curricula for her children. She started her own school, the "Little School" or the "Santo Domingo Calvert School," based on the Calvert Education system The initial school was held in an abandoned Episcopal Chapel and had three teachers, five students, and one room and worked with donated school supplies. Nearly 100 years later, the school had an enrollment of just over 1,000 students.

The Morgans returned to the United States in 1949, and the school was renamed Carol Morgan School (CMS) in her honor. In 1964, the Dominican government donated property, and the American embassy donated construction materials, and ground broke the following year on the land where the school is presently located. Construction was completed in 1965, and students began attending the new campus in 1966.

As of 2014, the school is located on a fifteen-acre campus in Santo Domingo. The elementary school has 34 classrooms; the middle school, 15; and the high school, 23. There are 7 computer labs with over 400 computers; a library and technology center; a theatre; an art pavilion; and band and choir classrooms. There is also an outdoor amphitheater for events, two soccer fields, and a fully-equipped gymnasium.

Academics
Carol Morgan offers instruction from pre-kindergarten through twelfth grade. The school is not religiously affiliated, and there is no religious instruction.

More than 98% of CMS graduates pursue a higher degree.

Carol Morgan School’s academic program places them at the top of private college preparatory schools in the Caribbean and Central America. They consistently strive to become a world-class innovation model in their curriculum, teaching & learning practices, and entrepreneurial spirit. 

Opportunities to discover, collaborate, explore, and experiment are woven throughout our curriculum at every grade level from Pre-Kindergarten to 12th grade. They employ design thinking techniques to teach students critical thinking while broadening their abilities and competencies. Their global connections and technology programs allow students to broaden their horizons while exploring science and technology through hands-on, real-world applications.

Athletics
CMS is associated with the Association of Colombian-Caribbean American Schools (ACCAS) and the Caribbean Area International School Sports Association (CAISSA). Elementary school students can play basketball and soccer, and middle and high school students can choose from baseball, basketball, soccer, volleyball, table tennis, competitive robotics, ultimate frisbee, and track and field.

Student body
During the 2018-2019 academic year, 58% of students came from the Dominican Republic, while the other 42% came from other countries, including the United States (30%), Argentina, Belgium, Bolivia, Brazil, Canada, China, Colombia, Denmark, Ecuador, El Salvador, Ethiopia, France, Germany, Israel, Italy, Jamaica, Japan, Mexico, the Netherlands, Nicaragua, Panama, Peru, Puerto Rico, South Korea, Spain, Switzerland, Taiwan, Trinidad and Tobago, United Kingdom, and Venezuela. Many students speak English as a second language.

Notable alumni
 Julia Alvarez (born 1950) (attended the school form 1955-1960), poet, novelist, and essayist best known for her novels How the García Girls Lost Their Accents and In the Time of the Butterflies
Distinguished Alumni Award Recipients
•2003	Simón Suárez ’68
•2004	Juan Batlle '72
•2005	Manuel Alejandro Grullón '70	
•2006	Julio Santos '84	
•2007	Ligia Bonetti '86	
•2008	Todd Martínez '85	
•2009	Mary Fernández '74	
•2010	José Rafael Yunen '90	
•2011	Gregory Castleman '72	
•2012	Steven Puig '78	
•2013	Ramón Cáceres '79	
•2014	Jaak E. Rannik ’60	
•2015	James H. Willig '91	
•2016	Georges Santoni ‘77	
•2017	Máximo Vidal ‘75	
•2018	Lucile Houellemont ‘86	
•2019	Miguel Viyella ‘74	
•2020	María Angélica Haza ‘86	
•2021	Robert E. Joslin '73	
•2022	Celso Marranzini '69

References

External links

American international schools in North America
International schools in the Dominican Republic
Schools in Santo Domingo